New Hythe railway station is on the Medway Valley Line in Kent, England, serving the village of New Hythe. The station and all trains that serve the station are operated by Southeastern.

The APTIS-equipped ticket office, in a 1930s building on the northbound platform, closed in September 1989 and subsequently became derelict. In 2007, a PERTIS (Permit to Travel) ticket machine was installed at the entrance to the northbound platform.

History 

Although the line between Strood and Maidstone, on which New Hythe lies, was completed in 1856, the station was not opened until 9 December 1929, when New Hythe Halt, a timber-built halt, was opened to serve the huge paper mill complex which had been established beside the line. The present, more substantial station was constructed in 1936, and the line was electrified in 1939.

Services 
All services at New Hythe are operated by Southeastern using  EMUs.

The typical off-peak service in trains per hour is:
 2 tph to 
 2 tph to  via 

On Sundays, the service is reduced to hourly in each direction.

References

External links 

History and photographs of the station at Kent Rail
Stephen Chapman's history of SER lines and services

Tonbridge and Malling
Railway stations in Kent
DfT Category F2 stations
Former Southern Railway (UK) stations
Railway stations in Great Britain opened in 1929
Railway stations served by Southeastern